The 1995 college football season may refer to:

 1995 NCAA Division I-A football season
 1995 NCAA Division I-AA football season
 1995 NCAA Division II football season
 1995 NCAA Division III football season
 1995 NAIA Division I football season
 1995 NAIA Division II football season